The Order of Danylo Halytsky is an award of Ukraine. The Order was instituted on February 20, 2003, by the Verkhovna Rada of Ukraine to honour the military men of the Armed Forces of Ukraine and other military formations created in compliance with the laws of Ukraine, as well as public servants for significant personal contribution in building of Ukraine, thorough and faultless service to the Ukrainian people.

Medals and ribbons 
Awards to serving members of the armed forces bear crossed swords.

External links 
 The Law of Ukraine On the State Awards of Ukraine

Military awards and decorations of Ukraine
Awards established in 2003
2003 establishments in Ukraine